Palaeodontidae is an extinct family of thelodont vertebrate agnathans that lived during the Lower Ordovician. The dermal denticles of these thelodonts lack a neck or base and form simple orthodentine cones.

References 

Agnatha
Prehistoric jawless fish families